Johann Melchior Kambly (January 1718 – 12 April 1783) was a Swiss sculptor who took part in the development of the architectural style of Frederician Rococo.

Kambly was born in Zürich.  He worked predominantly as a royal architect in Potsdam and contributed to, among others, Sanssouci Palace, the New Palace, the Chinese House and the New Chambers. No works have been recognized from his Swiss period.  He died in Potsdam.

The name Kambly is also written as Camply or Kambli.

External links
Komander, H. M: Von Schildkröt und bronce d'ormoly, Verein für die Geschichte Berlins e.V.

German sculptors
German male sculptors
1718 births
1783 deaths
People from Potsdam